Judge Fletcher may refer to:

Betty Binns Fletcher (1923–2012), judge of the United States Court of Appeals for the Ninth Circuit
Lloyd Fletcher (1915–1991), judge of the United States Court of Federal Claims
William A. Fletcher (born 1945), judge of the United States Court of Appeals for the Ninth Circuit

See also
Justice Fletcher (disambiguation)